In public transport, Route 16 may refer to:

Route 16 (MTA Maryland), a bus route in Baltimore, Maryland and its suburbs
London Buses route 16
Melbourne tram route 16

16